2019 Varsity Rugby was the 2019 edition of four rugby union competitions annually played between several university teams in South Africa. It was contested from 4 February to 22 April 2019 and was the twelfth edition of these competitions.

Varsity Cup

It was the first appearance in the competition for UWC, who won promotion from the 2018 Varsity Shield.

Varsity Shield

It was the first appearance in the competition for NMU Madibaz, who were relegated from the 2018 Varsity Cup.

Young Guns

Competition rules

There were nine participating universities in the 2019 Young Guns competition, the Under-20 sides of each of the nine Varsity Cup teams. These teams were divided into three regionalised sections and each team played every team in their section twice over the course of the season, once at home and once away.

Teams received four points for a win and two points for a draw. Bonus points were awarded to teams that scored four or more tries in a game, as well as to teams that lost a match by eight points or less. Teams were ranked by log points, then points difference (points scored less points conceded).

The three section winners qualified for the semi-finals, along with the runner-up with the best record.

Teams

Res Rugby

Competition rules

There were nine participating teams in the 2019 Res Rugby competition — the winners of the internal leagues of each of the nine Varsity Cup teams. These teams were divided into two divisions (a Championship division with five teams and a Premiership division with four teams) and each team played every team in their division once over the course of the season, either at home or away.

Teams received four points for a win and two points for a draw. Bonus points were awarded to teams that scored four or more tries in a game, as well as to teams that lost a match by eight points or less. Teams were ranked by log points, then points difference (points scored less points conceded).

The top two teams in the Championship qualified for the final.

See also

 Varsity Cup
 2019 Varsity Cup
 2019 Varsity Shield
 2019 Gold Cup

References

External links
 

2019
2019 in South African rugby union
2019 rugby union tournaments for clubs